Calomera is a genus of tiger beetles native to the Palearctic, the Near East and northern Africa. It contains the following species:

 Calomera alboguttata Klug, 1832
 Calomera angulata Fabricius, 1798
 Calomera aulica Dejean, 1831
 Calomera brevipilosa W. Horn, 1908
 Calomera cardoni Fleutiaux, 1890
 Calomera caucasica M. F. Adams, 1817
 Calomera chloris Hope, 1831
 Calomera concolor Dejean, 1822
 Calomera crespignyi Bates, 1871
 Calomera decemguttata Fabricius, 1801
 Calomera diania Tschitscherine, 1903
 Calomera durvillei Dejean, 1831
 Calomera fischeri M. F. Adams, 1817
 Calomera funerea MacLeay, 1825
 Calomera littoralis Fabricius, 1787
 Calomera lugens Dejean, 1831
 Calomera lunulata Fabricius, 1781
 Calomera mamasa Cassola & Brzoska, 2008
 Calomera plumigera W. Horn, 1892
 Calomera sturmi Menetries, 1832

References

External links
Calomera at Fauna Europaea

Cicindelidae